Rachel Ward is an American applied mathematician at the University of Texas at Austin. She is known for work on machine learning, optimization, and signal processing. 
At the University of Texas, she is W. A. "Tex" Moncrief Distinguished Professor in Computational Engineering and Sciences—Data Science, and professor of mathematics.

Education
Ward received her BS in mathematics from the University of Texas at Austin in 2005.  She earned her PhD in applied and computational mathematics from Princeton University in 2009. Her PhD advisor was Ingrid Daubechies.

Career 
Ward was an instructor at the Courant Institute from 2009-2011 and then joined faculty at the University of Texas at Austin in 2011. In 2018, she was a Visiting Research Scientist at Facebook AI Research and in 2019 she was a Von Neumann Fellow at the Institute for Advanced Study. She serves on the Scientific Advisory Board for the Institute for Computational and Experimental Research in Mathematics (ICERM).

Awards and honors
Rachel Ward was awarded an Alfred P. Sloan Research Fellowship in Mathematics in 2012.
Rachel Ward and Deanna Needell received the IMA Prize in Mathematics and Applications in 2016. Rachel Ward is an invited speaker at the 2022 International Congress of Mathematicians.

Research 
Ward worked on a project funded by the Department of Defense, with faculty from UT Austin's College of Natural Sciences and Cockrell School, to develop unmanned aerial vehicles.

References

External links 
 UT Faculty Profile Page
Learning Sparse High-Dimensional Governing Equations from Limited Data (Video)

Living people
American women mathematicians
University of Texas at Austin faculty
Year of birth missing (living people)
21st-century American women